Maida Vale is an electoral ward of the City of Westminster. The population at the 2011 Census was 10,210. The ward covers the area south of Kilburn, north of Little Venice and west of St John's Wood, bordered by Maida Vale (A5), Shirland Road, Sutherland Avenue and Kilburn Park Road. The ward contains Paddington Recreation Ground, Lauderdale Road Spanish & Portuguese Synagogue, Saint Augustine's church and is home to the BBC Maida Vale Studios. The area is served by Maida Vale station on the Bakerloo line, in addition to several bus routes running through the locality. There are two primary schools, Essendine Primary School and St Augustine's Primary School, two secondary schools, St Augustine's CE High School and St. George's Catholic School, in addition to three GP surgeries located in the ward.

The original Maida Vale ward, created in 1964, was larger in size and elected five councillors. For the May 1978 election, the ward was split into two: Maida Vale and Little Venice, each electing three councillors. There were minor boundary changes in 2002 and 2022.

The ward currently returns three councillors to Westminster City Council, with an election every four years. At the last election in May 2022, three candidates from the Labour Party were elected to represent the ward.

Councillors

1978–present 
Three councillors represent Maida Vale ward. Notable past councillors include MP Lee Rowley (2006 to 2014), former MP for Uxbridge Michael Shersby (1972 to 1997) and entrepreneur David Pitt-Watson (1986 to 1990).

1964–1978 
Five councillors represented Maida Vale ward between 1964 and 1978.

*1966 by-election caused by the death of George O'Connell.

Election results  
Like the other wards of Westminster, Maida Vale is represented by three councillors on Westminster City Council. The last election was held on 5 May 2022, when all three councillors were elected representing the Labour Party. Candidates seeking re-election are marked with an asterisk (*).

2022 election

2018 election

2014 election

2010 election

2006 election

2002 election

See also 

 Little Venice ward

References

External links 

 Westminster Conservative Party
 Westminster Labour Party

Wards in the City of Westminster